The Movement for the Progress of Madagascar (MFM - Mpitolona ho an'ny Fandrosoan'i Madagasikara) is a political party in Madagascar.

The Chairman of the party is Manandafy Rakotonirina.

The party was founded on 27 December 1972 as the Party for Proletarian Power (MFM - Mpitolona ho amin'ny Fanjakana ny Madinika). At the time it was a left-wing opposition to the military regime that had taken power the same year. It remained in opposition during the Ratsiraka regime and was part of the movement that forced him to give up his power in 1991. It also backed Marc Ravalomanana against Ratsiraka in the December 2001 presidential election and helped in persuading him to not accept the first official result but proclaim himself as the winner.

The party has converted to liberalism and changed its name. It is now an observer member of the Liberal International, which it joined at the latter's Marrakesh Congress in 2006.  Since the 23 September 2007 National Assembly elections it is no longer represented in parliament

References

External links 
Mpitolona ho amin'ny fandrosoan'ny Madagasikara

Political parties in Madagascar
Liberal International
Liberal parties in Africa
Political parties established in 1972
1972 establishments in Madagascar